Shafie is a name. People with this name include:

Abdel Aziz Abdel Shafie (born 1952), Egyptian football manager
Ghazali Shafie (1922-2010), Malaysian politician
Hadieh Shafie (born 1969), Iranian-American visual artist
Majed el-Shafie, campaigner based in Canada
Mohd Shafie Zahari (born 1993), Malaysian footballer
Shafie Apdal (born 1956), Malaysian politician
Shafie Effendy (born 1995), Bruneian footballer
Shafie Salleh (born 1946), Malaysian politician